Cnidus is a genus of African planthoppers in the family Achilidae. There are about 19 described species in Cnidus.

Species
These 19 species belong to the genus Cnidus:

 Cnidus akaensis Synave, 1962 c g
 Cnidus bingervillei Synave, 1965 c g
 Cnidus candida Synave, 1971 g
 Cnidus candidus Synave, 1971 c
 Cnidus conspersa Synave, 1965 g
 Cnidus conspersus Synave, 1965 c
 Cnidus fuscospersa (Synave, 1957) g
 Cnidus fuscospersus (Synave, 1957) c
 Cnidus marmorata (Jacobi, 1910) g
 Cnidus marmoratus (Jacobi, 1910) c
 Cnidus morosa Synave, 1971 g
 Cnidus morosus Synave, 1971 c
 Cnidus naevia (Jacobi, 1910) g
 Cnidus naevius (Jacobi, 1910) c
 Cnidus ndelelensis Synave, 1962 c g
 Cnidus pallida Synave, 1959 g
 Cnidus pallidus Synave, 1959 c
 Cnidus striatifrons Synave, 1959 c g
 Cnidus variegatus (Stål, 1855) c g

Data sources: i = ITIS, c = Catalogue of Life, g = GBIF, b = Bugguide.net

References

Further reading

 
 
 
 
 

Achilidae
Auchenorrhyncha genera
Hemiptera of Africa